The Pedeli is a 31 km long river in Estonia and Latvia.

Rivers of Estonia
Rivers of Latvia
Landforms of Valga County